Acquired perforating dermatosis is clinically and histopathologically similar to perforating folliculitis, also associated with chronic kidney failure, with or without hemodialysis or peritoneal dialysis, and/or diabetes mellitus, but not identical to Kyrle disease.

See also 
Cutaneous perforating disorders

References 

Conditions of the skin appendages